Stan Parks is a visual effects artist. He was nominated at the 73rd Academy Awards for his work on the film Hollow Man. He shared his nomination with Scott E. Anderson, Craig Hayes and Scott Stokdyk. This was in the category of Best Visual Effects.

Selected filmography

 The Right Stuff (1983)
 Scarface (1983)
 Jagged Edge (1985)
 Gung Ho (1986)
Project Retaliation (1986)
 Tough Guys (1986)
 Planes, Trains & Automobiles (1987)
 Mississippi Burning (1988)
 Black Rain (1989)
 Home Alone 2: Lost in New York (1992)
 I.Q. (1994)
 Wolf (1994)
 Jumanji (1995)
 Flubber (1997)
 Hollow Man (2000)
 Rat Race (2001)
 XxX (2002)
 Big Fish (2003)
 Flight of the Phoenix (2004)
 Deja Vu (2006)
 G-Force (2009)
 Public Enemies (2009)
 Battle: Los Angeles (2011)
 Battleship (2012)
 2 Guns (2013)
 Man of Steel (2013)
 Fury (2014)
 Need for Speed (2014)
 Taken 3 (2015)

References

External links

Living people
Special effects people
Year of birth missing (living people)
Place of birth missing (living people)